Psychedelic Mango is the debut studio album by Australian psychedelic rock band Pond. The album was released on 9 January 2009 (only 500 copies were pressed) through Badminton Bandit and re-released digitally in 2010. According to the liner notes, it was recorded by Nick Allbrook, Jay Watson, and Shiny Joe Ryan in Allbrook's parents' house, on their 8-track tape machine.

Track listing

References

2009 debut albums